Zion Evangelical Lutheran Church may refer to:
Zion Evangelical Church (Evansville, Indiana), a National Register of Historic Places listing in Vanderburgh County, Indiana
 Zion Evangelical Lutheran Church (Petoskey, Michigan), a National Register of Historic Places listing in Emmet County, Michigan
 Zion Evangelical Lutheran Church (Flourtown, Pennsylvania)
 Zion Evangelical Lutheran Church (Hartland, Wisconsin)
 Zion Evangelical Lutheran Church and Parsonage, Columbus, Wisconsin
 Zion Evangelical Lutheran Church (Lunenburg), Nova Scotia
Zion Evangelical Lutheran Church (Chicago)

See also
Zion Church (disambiguation)
Zion Evangelical Lutheran Church Cemetery, Speedwell, Virginia
Zion Lutheran Church (disambiguation)